Spice is an unincorporated community in Pocahontas County, West Virginia, United States.

History
A post office called Spice was established in 1912, and remained in operation until it was discontinued in 1943. The community was named for the spices harvested in the hills.

References

Unincorporated communities in Pocahontas County, West Virginia
Unincorporated communities in West Virginia